Limnohabitans is a genus of bacteria established by Hahn et al. (2010). The genus contains four species which all represent planktonic bacteria dwelling in the water column of freshwater lakes, reservoirs, and streams.

Genomics 

Draft genome sequences of two strains most likely representing two undescribed Limnohabitans species were published.

References

External links 
 Limnohabitans – J.P. Euzéby: List of Prokaryotic names with Standing in Nomenclature
 Limnohabitans – NCBI Taxonomy Browser

Comamonadaceae
Bacteria genera